Benjamin Ferrey FSA FRIBA (1 April 1810–22 August 1880) was an English architect who worked mostly in the Gothic Revival.

Family
Benjamin Ferrey was the youngest son of Benjamin Ferrey Snr (1779–1847), a draper who became Mayor of Christchurch, and his wife Ann Pillgrem (1773–1824). He was educated at Wimborne Grammar School.

Ferrey married twice. On 26 April 1836 at Islington, he married Ann Mary (Annie) Lucas (1812–1871). They had five children: Alicia (1838–1924), Ellen (1840–41), Eleanor Mary (1842–45),
Benjamin Edmund (1845–1900) and 
Annie (1847–1926). Benjamin Edmund or Edmund Benjamin also became an architect, studying under his father and then assisting in his work. 

After the death of his first wife in 1871, he married a second time, in 1872 at Weymouth, Dorset to Emily Hopkinson (1829–1922).

Ferrey died on 22 August 1880 at his London home.

Ancestors

Career
After grammar school, Ferrey went to London to study under Augustus Charles Pugin and alongside Pugin's son Augustus Welby Northmore Pugin.

In his early twenties Ferrey toured continental Europe, then studied further in the office of William Wilkins. He started his own architectural practice in 1834, in Great Russell Street, Bloomsbury, London. Some of the earliest work of his practice was in the design of the new seaside resort of Bournemouth, particularly his work on Bournemouth Gardens with Decimus Burton. The business grew rapidly and was very successful, with Ferrey designing and restoring or rebuilding many Church of England parish churches. Ferrey also designed private houses and public buildings, including a number of Tudor Revival ones in the earlier part of his career.

Charles Eastlake in his History of the Gothic Revival  described Ferrey as "one of the earliest, ablest, and most zealous pioneers of the modern Gothic school" and said his work "possessed the rare charm of simplicity, without lacking interest".

Ferrey was twice Vice-President of the Royal Institute of British Architects and in 1870 was awarded a Royal Gold Medal. He was Diocesan Architect to the Diocese of Bath and Wells from 1841 until his death, carrying out much of the restoration work on Wells Cathedral and the Bishop's Palace. He was also appointed Honorary Secretary to the Architects' Committee for the Houses of Parliament.

Work

Buildings
Tarrant Hinton, Dorset: Old Rectory, 1836
Westover, Hampshire: estate of villas, 1836 (demolished 1906–29)
Royal Bath Hotel, Bournemouth, Hampshire (now Dorset), 1837–38
St Thomas of Canterbury parish church, Compton Valence, Dorset: rebuilding of church (except tower), 1839–40
Dorset County Hospital, Dorchester, Dorset, 1839 onwards
Clyffe House, Tincleton, Dorset, 1842
Parish church of St James, Hambridge, Somerset, 1842

Parish church of St Nicholas, Corfe, Somerset, 1842
All Saints' parish church, Dogmersfield, Hampshire, 1843
All Saints' parish church, High East Street, Dorchester, Dorset, (with ADH Acland) 1843–45
St James' parish church, Morpeth, Northumberland, 1843–46
St John the Evangelist Church, Hale, Surrey, 1844, rare example of Romanesque rather than Gothic work
St Nicholas' parish church, Grafton, Wiltshire, 1844
St Mary's parish church, Winterborne Whitchurch, Dorset: rebuilt nave, added south aisle and south transept, 1844
St Thomas' parish church, Keresley, Coventry, 1844–45
St Mary's parish church, Chilton Foliat, Wiltshire: restoration, 1845
Holy Trinity parish church, Nuffield, Oxfordshire: restored chancel, 1845
St Stephen's parish church, Baughurst, Hampshire, 1845
Christ Church parish church, Melplash, Dorset, 1845–46
St Swithin's parish church, Wickham, Berkshire, 1845–49: nave, chancel and upper part of bell-tower
Holy Trinity parish church, Yeovil, Somerset, 1843–46
St Osmund's parish church, Osmington, Dorset: reconstruction, 1846
St Barnabas' parish church, Swanmore, Hampshire, 1846
St Edmund's parish church, Vobster, Somerset, 1846
St Mary's parish church, Twyford, Berkshire, 1846
St Peter's parish church, West Lydford, Somerset, 1846
Saints Peter and Paul chapel, Bishop's Palace, Cuddesdon, Oxfordshire, 1846

Market cross, Glastonbury, Somerset, 1846
Christ Church, Henton, Somerset, 1847
Municipal Buildings, Dorchester, Dorset, 1847–48
St Boniface' parish church, Bonchurch, Isle of Wight, 1847–48
St Peter's College, Saltley, Birmingham, 1847–52
St Barnabas' parish church, Linslade, Bedfordshire, 1848
St John the Baptist parish church, Plush, Dorset, 1848
Holy Trinity parish church, Henley-on-Thames, Oxfordshire, 1848
St Mary the Virgin parish church, Stamfordham, Northumberland: restoration, 1848
Christchurch Priory, Hampshire: pulpitum, 1848
Stafford House, West Stafford, Dorset: west front, 1848–50
St Margaret's parish church, Harpsden, Oxfordshire: extended nave, added aisle and bell tower, 1848–54
Holy Trinity parish church, Penn Street, Buckinghamshire, 1849
St John the Evangelist parish church, Tincleton, Dorset, 1849
 The (Old) School House, Tincleton, Dorset, circa 1849.
Holy Trinity parish church, Wood Green, Witney, Oxfordshire, 1849
St Peter's parish church, Cranbourne, Berkshire, 1849
All Saints' parish church, Bisham, Berkshire: restoration, 1849
All Saints' parish church, Cuddesdon, Oxfordshire: restoration, 1849
St Thomas' parish church, Colnbrook, Buckinghamshire, 1849–52
Holy Trinity parish church, Grazeley, Berkshire, 1850
St Michael and All Angels Church, Littlebredy, Dorset: rebuilding of church and addition of spire, 1850
St Botolph's parish church, Swyncombe, Oxfordshire: restoration, 1850
St Teilo's Church, Merthyr Mawr, (formerly Glamorgan), 1851
St Laurence's parish church, Upton, Slough, Buckinghamshire: south aisle, 1852
St Mark's parish church, Hedgerley, Buckinghamshire, 1852
St Mary's parish church, Kirtlington, Oxfordshire: rebuilt tower, 1853
Holy Trinity parish church, Deanshanger, Northamptonshire, 1853
St Paul's parish church, Neithrop, Banbury, Oxfordshire, 1853
Parish church of St Mary, Buckland St Mary, Somerset, 1853–63
Battleford Hall, Fleet, Lincolnshire. Old Rectory, 1854
St Mark's parish church, Fairfield, Worcestershire, 1854
All Saints parish church, Huntsham, Devon, 1854–56
Parish church of All Saints, Castle Cary, Somerset: rebuilding, 1855
Christ Church, Bala, Gwynedd (formerly Merionethshire), 1855.
St Giles' parish church, Barlestone, Leicestershire, 1855
St Paul's parish church, Scropton, Derbyshire, 1855–56
All Saints' parish church, Curland, Somerset, 1856
Chapels at Ocklynge cemetery, Eastbourne, East Sussex, 1857

All Saints' Blackheath, Blackheath, London, 1857–67
Christ Church, Eastbourne, East Sussex, 1859
Grammar School, Morpeth, Northumberland, 1859
Chase Cliffe house, Crich, Derbyshire, 1859–61
St Andrew's parish church, West Hatch, Somerset, 1861
Parish church of All Saints, Merriott, Somerset: chancel, chapels, east end of nave, 1862
Bulstrode Park, Buckinghamshire: house, 1862
Christchurch Priory, Dorset (formerly Hampshire): restoration including porch vaulting, 1862

Parish church of St Mary Magdalene, Taunton, Somerset: rebuilding, with George Gilbert Scott, 1862
Parish church of St Mary the Virgin, East Stoke, Somerset: restoration, 1862
St Mary's parish church, Eling, Hampshire: restoration, 1863–65
SS Mary and Peter's parish church, Pett, East Sussex, 1864
St Mary's parish church, Warmington, Northamptonshire: restored chancel, 1865
St Michael and  All Angels' church, Chetwynd, Shropshire, 1865–67
All Hallows' parish church, Whitchurch, Hampshire: restoration, 1866
St Mary's parish church, East Lydford, Somerset, 1866
Parish church of SS Peter and Paul, Lufton, Somerset, 1866
St Giles' Church, Wrexham (formerly Denbighshire): restoration, 1867

Huntsham Court, Huntsham, Devon, 1868–70
Parish church of All Saints, Chipstable, Somerset, 1869
St Michael's parish church, Otterton, Devon: rebuilt 1869–71
Christ Church parish church and vicarage, Colbury, Hampshire, 1870
St James' parish church, Birlingham, Worcestershire: rebuilt 1871–72
St John the Evangelist, Holdenhurst, Hampshire (now Dorset): chancel, 1873
St Mary's parish church, Bransgore, Hampshire: chancel, 1873
Church of St Michael, Enmore, Somerset: restoration, new north aisle, 1873
Church of St Mary Magdalene, Wookey Hole, Somerset, 1873–74
St Mary's parish church, Tarrant Hinton, Dorset: chancel, 1874
St Mary's Church, Wingham 1874–75
Parish Church of St Luke, Burton, Christchurch, Dorset (1874–75) 
Holy Trinity parish church, High West Street, Dorchester, Dorset, 1875–76
Parish church of the Holy Cross, Babcary, Somerset: north aisle, 1876
Christchurch Priory, Hampshire: nave gallery
Jumpers' Cemetery, Christchurch, Hampshire (now Dorset): arched gateway and two chapels

Buildings by Edmund Benjamin Ferrey (the son) 

Church of St Deiniol, Llanuwchllyn, Gwynedd (1873)
St Bartholomew's Church, Burstow, Surrey (1884–95)
Church of St Thomas a Becket, Framfield, East Sussex (1892) (Tower rebuilt)

Publications

References

Bibliography

External links

 
Benjamin Ferrey - A Biographical Note
 

1810 births
1880 deaths
19th-century English architects
Gothic Revival architects
English ecclesiastical architects
People from Christchurch, Dorset
Fellows of the Royal Institute of British Architects
Recipients of the Royal Gold Medal
Architects of cathedrals
People educated at Queen Elizabeth's Grammar School, Wimborne Minster
Architects from Hampshire